Qarabiy yayla is a mountain range and botanical zakaznik (nature reserve) located in Crimea, a region internationally recognised as part of Ukraine but occupied by Russia since 2014. The highest range of the Crimean Mountains, Qarabiy yayla is best known for its picturesque views and large number of caves.

Description 

Qarabiy yayla is best known for its caves. Another popular attraction in Qarabiy yayla is Tay Qoba, and from there to the nearby . Qarabiy yayla is home to several protected areas, including the range itself, which is home to a botanical nature reserve for medicinal plants.

History 

Archaeological findings corresponding to the prehistorical Kizil-Koba culture have been found on Qarabiy yayla, dating back to the 7th or 8th century BCE. These findings last up until the 2nd century BCE.

During World War II, Crimea was fully captured by Nazi German forces by 1942. In order to receive supplies from the Red Army, an impromptu airfield was established on Qarabiy yayla. From 28 September 1942 until the Crimean peninsula was fully recaptured by the Soviets on 12 May 1944, over 240 tonnes of cargo were delivered to the Crimean Soviet partisans, and 450 people were evacuated from Crimea to areas under Soviet control.

References 

Crimean Mountains
Crimea in World War II
Mountain ranges of Ukraine
Mountain ranges of Russia
Nature reserves in Ukraine